Kypris may refer to:
 Cypris, or Aphrodite, a Greek goddess
 Yorgos Kypris, Greek sculptor

See also 
 Cypris (disambiguation)
 Cyprus (disambiguation)